Cross is an English topographic surname for someone who lived on a road near a stone cross.

Notable persons with the surname Cross include:

By given name

A–C 
A.F. Cross (1863–1940), English poet, playwright, journalist and author
Alan Cross, Canadian radio broadcaster and author
Alex Cross (footballer) (1919–1998), Scottish footballer
Alexander Cross (1903–1973), Welsh actor
Amanda Cross, pen name of Carolyn Gold Heilbrun, an American academic and author
Amos Cross (1860–1888), American baseball player
Andrew Cross (footballer) (born 1961), Australian rules footballer
Anthony Glenn Cross (born 1936), English slavist
Anthony John Cross (born 1945), English cricketer
Art Cross (1918–2005), American race car driver
Arthur Henry Cross (1884–1965), English recipient of the Victoria Cross
Ben Cross (1947–2020), English actor
Ben Cross (rugby league) (born 1978), Australian rugby league footballer
Benny Cross (1898-1986), English footballer
Bernice Cross (1912–1996), American artist
Billy Cross (born 1946), American musician
Billy Cross (American football) (1929–2013), American football player
Burton M. Cross (1902–1998), American politician
Charles Cross (disambiguation), multiple people
Chris Cross (born 1952), English musician 
Christopher Cross (born 1951), American musician
Cory Cross (born 1971), Canadian ice hockey player

D–F 
Daniel Cross (filmmaker), Canadian documentary filmmaker and producer
Daniel Cross (footballer) (born 1983), Australian rules footballer
David Cross (born 1964), American actor and comedian
David Cross (artist), British artist
David Cross (footballer born 1950), English footballer
David Cross (footballer born 1982), English footballer
David Cross (musician) (born 1949), English musician
Dennis Cross (1924–1991), American film and television actor
Dolores Cross, American educator and university administrator
Dorothy Cross (born 1956), British artist
Douglas Cross (1892–1970), Australian politician
Edith Cross, American tennis player
Edward Cross (politician) (1798–1887), American politician
Edward E. Cross (1832–1863), American Army General
Eliska Cross (born 1986), French actress
Emily Cross (born 1986), American fencer
Frank Cross (baseball) (1873–1932), American baseball player
Frank Leslie Cross (1900–1968), English theologian
Frank Moore Cross (1921–2012), American scholar

G–I 
Garvin Cross, stuntman and actor
George Lynn Cross (1905–1998), American educator
Gillian Cross (born 1945), English author
Graham Cross (born 1943), English-born footballer
H. Morrey Cross (born 1921-2008), served as the International Commissioner of Scouts Canada
Hardy Cross (1885–1959), American engineer
Helen Cross (author) (born 1967), English author
Helen Cross (politician), Australian politician
Henri-Edmond Cross (1856–1910), French pointillist painter
Howard Cross (born 1967), American football player
Hugh Cross (1925–1989), British actor
Hugh W. Cross (1896–1972), American politician
Ian Cross (rugby league) (born 1989), Irish rugby footballer
Irv Cross (1939–2021), American football player and commentator

J–N 
James Cross, a British former diplomat in Canada who was kidnapped by militants in 1970
James Albert Cross, a lawyer and political figure in Saskatchewan, Canada
James B. Cross (1819–1876), American lawyer and politician
James U. Cross (1925–2015), a retired United States Air Force brigadier general and author
Jane T. H. Cross (1817–1870), American author
Jason Cross (born 1979), American professional wrestler
Jeff Cross (basketball) (born 1961), American basketball player
Joan Cross (1900–1993), English singer
John Kynaston Cross (1832–1887), British cotton spinner and Liberal Party Member of Parliament for Bolton
Jonathan Cross (born 1975), English footballer
Joseph Cross (actor) (born 1986), American actor
Karen Cross (born 1974), English tennis player
Kathryn Cross (born 1991), English cricketer
Kendall Cross (wrestler) (born 1968), American wrestler
Kenneth Cross (1911–2003), Royal Air Force commander
Lave Cross (1866–1927), American baseball player
Lloyd Cross, American physicist and holographer
Malcolm Cross, Scottish rugby footballer
Manfred Cross (born 1929), Australian politician
Marcia Cross (born 1962), American actress
Mark Cross (disambiguation)
Martin Cross (born 1957), British oarsman
Merv Cross, Australian doctor and former rugby league footballer
Mike Cross (disambiguation)
Milton Cross (1897–1975), American radio announcer, opera expert
Monte Cross (1869–1934), American baseball player
Neil Cross (born 1969), British novelist and scriptwriter 
Niki Cross (born 1985), American footballer
Nick Cross (disambiguation), multiple people
Nicky Cross (born 1961), English footballer

O–R 
Paul Cross (disambiguation)
Peter Cross (disambiguation)
Philip Cross (1826–1888), Irish murderer
R. A. Cross, 1st Viscount Cross (1823–1914), British statesman and Conservative politician
Randy Cross (born 1954), American football analyst and former NFL lineman
Richard Cross (disambiguation)
Rob Cross (basketball), basketball coach
Rob Cross (darts player) (born 1990), English darts player 
Robert Thomas Cross (1850–1923), English astrologer
Roger Cross (born 1969), Canadian actor
Sir Ronald Cross, 1st Baronet (1896–1968), English politician and diplomat
Ronald Anthony Cross (1937–2006), American author
Roy Cross (footballer) (born 1947), English footballer
Rupert Cross (1912–1980), English jurist
Ryan Cross (born 1979), Australian rugby footballer

S–Z 
Shirley Gale Cross (1915–2008), American botanist, botanical illustrator, and conservationist
Stan Cross (1888–1977), Australian strip and political cartoonist
Steve Cross (footballer) (born 1959), English footballer
Tara Cross-Battle (born 1968), American volleyball player
Terry M. Cross, American Coast Guard Admiral 2004–2006
Tim Cross (born 1951), retired British Army officer
Tom Cross (politician) (born 1958), American politician
Tom Cross (rugby) (1876–1930), New Zealand rugby footballer
Tom Peete Cross (1897–1951), American Celticist and folklorist
Tracy L. Cross (born 1958), American psychologist and academic
Travis Cross (born 1980), Canadian wrestler
Ulric Cross (1917–2013), Trinidadian lawyer, diplomat and RAF navigator
Veronica Ann Cross, English beauty queen
Wilbur Cross, American author
Wilbur Lucius Cross (1862–1948), American educator and politician
William Cross (disambiguation)
Zora Cross (1890–1964), Australian poet

Characters
 Aaron Cross, the main protagonist of the 2012 film The Bourne Legacy
 Alex Cross, a fictional character and the protagonist in the James Patterson Alex Cross series of novels
 Angela Cross, a fictional character from 2003 video game Ratchet & Clank: Going Commando
 Augustine Cross, a fictional character in Marvel Comics
 Carland Cross, a fictional character and the protagonist of the Carland Cross TV series and novels
 Cora Cross, a fictional character in the BBC soap opera EastEnders
 Darren Cross, a Marvel Comics supervillain
 Gina Cross, a fictional character in the Half-Life video game series
 Jack Cross, a fictional character from the comic book series of the same name
 James Cross, a fictional character in the TV series Callan
 Kaleb Cross, the real name of the playable character Revenant in Apex Legends
 Noah Cross, a fictional character and villain in the 1974 film Chinatown
 Rainie Cross, a fictional character in the BBC soap opera EastEnders
 Sergeant Cross, a fictional character featured in the Need for Speed: Most Wanted and Need for Speed: Carbon video games

Related surnames
 Crouch
 Croucher

See also
 Crosse – alternate spelling

English-language surnames